Barnard is a city in Lincoln County, Kansas, United States.  As of the 2020 census, the population of the city was 64.

History
Barnard was first settled in 1888 when a rail line of the Chicago, Kansas & Western Railroad Company, reached the town, and it was incorporated as a city in 1904. Barnard was named for J.F. Barnard, a railroad employee.

The Atchison, Topeka and Santa Fe Railway acquired the C,K & W.R. in 1901. The railroad applied in 1983 to abandon the 43.38 mile "Minneapolis District" line from Manchester, Kansas to Barnard.The Minneapolis District, Abandoned Rails, Retrieved 21 February 2022

Geography
Barnard is located at  (39.189213, -98.043078).

Climate
The climate in this area is characterized by hot, humid summers and generally mild to cool winters.  According to the Köppen Climate Classification system, Barnard has a humid subtropical climate, abbreviated "Cfa" on climate maps.

Demographics

2010 census
As of the census of 2010, there were 70 people, 43 households, and 16 families residing in the city. The racial makeup of the city was 100.0% White.

There were 43 households, of which 9.3% had children under the age of 18 living with them, 27.9% were married couples living together, 7.0% had a female householder with no husband present, 2.3% had a male householder with no wife present, and 62.8% were non-families. 55.8% of all households were made up of individuals, and 11.7% had someone living alone who was 65 years of age or older. The average household size was 1.63 and the average family size was 2.38.

The median age in the city was 49.3 years. 10% of residents were under the age of 18; 10.1% were between the ages of 18 and 24; 15.8% were from 25 to 44; 45.6% were from 45 to 64; and 18.6% were 65 years of age or older. The gender makeup of the city was 60.0% male and 40.0% female.

2000 census
As of the census of 2000, there were 123 people, 62 households, and 37 families residing in the city. The racial makeup of the city was 100.00% White.

There were 62 households, out of which 19.4% had children under the age of 18 living with them, 54.8% were married couples living together, 4.8% had a female householder with no husband present, and 40.3% were non-families. 40.3% of all households were made up of individuals, and 16.1% had someone living alone who was 65 years of age or older. The average household size was 1.98 and the average family size was 2.65.

In the city, the population was spread out, with 17.9% under the age of 18, 5.7% from 18 to 24, 18.7% from 25 to 44, 30.9% from 45 to 64, and 26.8% who were 65 years of age or older. The median age was 48 years. For every 100 females, there were 112.1 males. For every 100 females age 18 and over, there were 110.4 males.

The median income for a household in the city was $26,667, and the median income for a family was $33,333. Males had a median income of $22,500 versus $17,917 for females. The per capita income for the city was $18,329. There were 22.2% of families and 14.7% of the population living below the poverty line, including 25.0% of under eighteens and 18.5% of those over 64.

Economy
The only businesses or services remaining in Barnard are a post office and a small grocery.

Education
The community is served by Lincoln USD 298 public school district.

Barnard schools were closed through school unification in 1966. The Barnard High School team name was "Cardinals".

References

Further reading

External links
 Barnard - Directory of Public Officials
 History of Barnard, Legends of Kansas
 Barnard city map, KDOT

Cities in Kansas
Cities in Lincoln County, Kansas
1888 establishments in Kansas
Populated places established in 1888